is a railway station in the city of Fukushima, Fukushima Prefecture, Japan operated by East Japan Railway Company (JR East).

Lines
Kanayagawa Station is served by the Tōhoku Main Line, and is located 264.0 rail kilometers from the official starting point of the line at Tokyo Station.

Station layout
The station has one island platform connected to the station building by a footbridge. The station has a Midori no Madoguchi staffed ticket office.

Platforms

History
The station opened on October 18, 1909. The Matsukawa derailment, an alleged sabotage that resulted in the derailment of a train, occurred near the station on August 17, 1949. The station was absorbed into the JR East network upon the privatization of the Japanese National Railways (JNR) on April 1, 1987.

Passenger statistics
In fiscal 2018, the station was used by an average of 2886 passengers daily (boarding passengers only).

See also
 List of Railway Stations in Japan

References

External links

  

Stations of East Japan Railway Company
Railway stations in Fukushima Prefecture
Tōhoku Main Line
Railway stations in Japan opened in 1909
Fukushima (city)